The United Sarawak Party (abbreviated PSB) is a multi-racial political party based in the state of Sarawak.

In 2021, PSB managed to retain their four seats (Batu Lintang, Engkilili, Ba'kelalan and Bawang Assan), making it the new opposition party in Sarawak, replacing Pakatan Harapan which only won two seats (Pending and Padungan, all under DAP).

History

Formation as United People's Party (UPP) 

The party was initially founded as United People's Party and officially launched on 17 August 2014 as a new symbol of change and unity for the Chinese community of Sarawak with its headquarters based at Kuching. The UPP was actually a splinter party of Sarawak United People's Party (SUPP) set-up by the Second Finance Minister for Sarawak, Wong Soon Koh along with his supporters following a leadership tussle of the party then and it started as a pro-Barisan Nasional (BN) political pact However the hopes that the UPP would join BN were objected by the coalition leadership. UPP rejected Parti Pesaka Bumiputera Bersatu (PBB)'s suggestion that UPP should dissolve to pave the way for its members to join other Sarawak BN component parties arguing that they have over 26 full-fledged branches with 30,000 members and that UPP was able to raise RM38 million (US$9.3 million) for an education fund in less than a fortnight. UPP's ability to raise significant funds is widely attributed to the support they enjoy from Sarawak's powerful timber tycoons.

A Memorandum of Understanding (MoU) was made between UPP and SUPP of BN for the division of seats to be contested in the 2016 Sarawak state election which saw UPP win five out of seven seats it was allocated. UPP however cancelled the MoU with SUPP after the 2016 state election.

Both rival parties again signed MoU for collaboration in the 2018 general election (GE14). After the GE14 which saw the downfall of BN federal government, the state BN components quit and formed themselves as the new Gabungan Parti Sarawak (GPS) coalition without UPP.

Re-branding as Parti Sarawak Bersatu (PSB) 
UPP was re-branded to United Sarawak Party or Parti Sarawak Bersatu (PSB), after an Extraordinary Delegates Conference (EDC) on 8 December 2018. The party's name change and new logo was approved by the Registrar of Societies (RoS) in 2019. PSB, amidst of being left out of the newly formed GPS coalition, choose to maintain its status quo, but shifted from being a BN-friendly to GPS-friendly party by providing supply and confidence to the new GPS coalition of the Sarawak state government. Somehow the party status changed when PSB opted to be an independent instead when its president, Wong, tendered his resignation from the state Cabinet as the International Trade and e-Commerce Minister and second Minister of Finance in July 2019 .

2020–21 Malaysian political crisis 
During the 2020 Malaysian political crisis, the support inclination of PSB Sri Aman MP; Masir Kujat, was in much speculation and attention for the tussling parties of the political scene. Despite being arranged to be seated alongside the new governing Perikatan Nasional (PN) backbencher MPs in the Dewan Rakyat during the historic the one-day Parliament sitting on 17 May, Masir has clarified that he and the PSB party is still in the opposition bloc in the federal and state levels.

Impact of the prolonged political crisis had also witnessed two former Sarawak People's Justice Party (PKR) legislature representatives; Selangau MP incumbent Ba Kelalan assemblyman Baru Bian and Batu Lintang assemblyman See Chee How, together with their supporters have joined PSB on 30 May 2020. In August 2021, PM Muhyiddin Yassin of PN resigned, PSB pledge to support PH's Anwar Ibrahim as prime ministerial candidate but will back Shafie Apdal of Parti Warisan Sabah as an alternative if Anwar not chosen. PSB though stated it wish to remain an independent party without affiliation to any political alliance including PH.

Elected representatives 
Member of Parliament

Dewan Undangan Negeri (State Legislative Assembly)

Malaysian State Assembly Representatives 

PSB for the time being has 3 members in the 19th Sarawak State Legislative Assembly:

General election results

State election results

See also 
 Politics of Malaysia
 List of political parties in Malaysia

References

External links
 

Political parties in Sarawak
2014 establishments in Malaysia
Political parties established in 2014